From List of National Natural Landmarks, these are the National Natural Landmarks in California.  There are 37 in total.

References

California
National Natural Landmarks